= Brenna George =

Canadian artist

Brenna George is a Canadian artist known for her painting and video art.

Her work is included in the collections of the National Gallery of Canada and the Surrey Art Gallery.
